Harrisburg Bureau of Fire (HBF) is a firefighting agency that is located in and serves Harrisburg, Pennsylvania, and its surrounding metropolitan area. It is a career firefighting agency with at least 15 firefighters and fire officers on duty at any given time, supplemented with volunteer staffing as well. Everyday duties for the Bureau include fire suppression, emergency medical services, tactical rescue, urban search and rescue, water rescue, hazardous materials response, fire prevention, fire codes enforcement, and public safety educations.

History 

Though a volunteer bucket brigade was established in 1791 (and several other temporary ones existed throughout the 19th century), the first hose companies with carriages were formed in 1841 following the installation of the city's water system. On December 1, 1913 following the passing of Clark Act to restructure Pennsylvania cities, the Bureau was named so under the Department of Public Safety (headed by the Mayor). Despite this technicality, it is not uncommon to hear "Harrisburg Fire Department" instead of "Bureau." In 2018, the city approved a budget of 10.1 million dollars, along with a Future of Fire report stating the need for updated equipment and apparatuses in the next 10 years. In January 2019, the city announced its plan to purchase 12 new pieces of apparatus from 2020 through 2035.

Operations

Specialty units 

 HAZMAT unit; the HBF is the home station for Hazmat 77 which is housed at Station 1. HAZMAT 77 was recently moved to Dauphin county hazmat teams new station and the team moved HAZMAT 77-3 to station 1. Hazmat 77 is a part of the Dauphin County Hazmat team. 
 Urban search and rescue unit; Harrisburg is mostly urban with small patches of wooded areas and parks throughout. In 1983 the HBF formed an urban search and rescue unit with two Ford F-350 marked trucks. This team is made up of numerous department employees as well as dozens of civilian volunteers.
 Marine rescue unit; the marine rescue unit is make up of one fireboat and three smaller rescue boats. Due to Harrisburg's proximity to the Susquehanna River the HBF often respond to emergencies in the water. Majority of which include missing swimmers/sportsmen and vehicles which entered the water. This unit is made up of department volunteers and is located at station 8 due to its proximity to the waterfront. The marine unit can respond anywhere along the cities waterfront within 15 minutes of a call.

Stations and apparatus 

 Station 1: 1820 N. 6th Street
 Station 2: 140 N. 16th Street
 Station 8: 9 S. 13th Street
 Department of Public Safety HQ/de facto Station 4: 123 Walnut Street (Vance C. McCormick Public Service Center)

The Bureau has over 30 apparatuses, trucks, and vans. The HBF fleet contains Pierce and Seagrave firefighting apparatus and Freightliner ambulances. The truck and SUV brands used by the department include Ford and Chevrolet.

Fallen firefighters

See also 

 List of fire departments
 List of Pennsylvania fire departments
 Firefighting

References 

Harrisburg, Pennsylvania
Fire departments in Pennsylvania